Jack Ferguson (21 July 1901 – 10 October 1966) was an  Australian rules footballer who played with South Melbourne in the Victorian Football League (VFL).

Notes

External links 

1901 births
1966 deaths
Australian rules footballers from Victoria (Australia)
Sydney Swans players
Place of birth missing
Place of death missing